DDPO may refer to:

 Defense Dissemination Program Office, see National Geospatial-Intelligence Agency
 DDPO, a Tehsil management office, see Sambrial
 Dolce+DnS Plan Ontology, see process ontology